Maria Zuchowicz (born in Poznań, in 1930 – 24 November 2020) was a Polish lawyer and figure skating official. She was Chairperson of Appeal Commission of the International Skating Union and Vice-President of the Polish Figure Skating Associations. She was also international skating judge including as a judge and referee of the Olympic Games in Grenoble, Innsbruck, Sapporo and Calgary.

A Member of the CAS ad hoc Division at the Winter Olympic Games, Nagano, 1998, Ms. Zuchowicz was also President and arbitrator of the Court of Sport of the Polish Olympic Committee and arbitrator of the Football amicable Court of the Polish Football Union.

She has been commenting on figure skating events for the Polish national television (TVP) and was a judge in the first (autumn 2007) and second (spring 2008) Polish edition of the Dancing on Ice.

Sources

1930 births
2020 deaths
Figure skating officials
Figure skating judges
Polish referees and umpires
Sportspeople from Poznań
21st-century Polish lawyers
20th-century Polish lawyers
Polish women lawyers
20th-century women lawyers
21st-century women lawyers
20th-century Polish women